Sir (also Romanized as Sīr) also Seiri in Assyrian Aramaic and Monsieur in French, is an originally upland area and village in Baranduz Rural District, in the Central District of Urmia County, West Azerbaijan Province, Iran. At the 2006 census, its population was 134, in 32 families.

Sir is located the historically significant stone church of Mar Sargis, a shrine visited by the faithful for healing, both Christian and Muslim.  Due to its fresh mountain air, Sir became the summer station for both English and American missionaries based in Urmia.

On 1800s a proto-evangelical English missionary led by Sir John White and Dr Elisabeth Hobart also built a small worship place in Urmia, known as Ojag-e Sir (Sir's Henge, God's House of Sir) later renamed and converted to Kelisay-e Hazrat-e Maryam (The Church of Saint Mary). There is a remaining room of mentioned sacred address which is located in the close outskirts of Janveslou Village, foothill of ‘Sir's Mountain. The village colloquially named Janveslou/Village of John and Elisa and it is widely known to have historically offered safety to various displaced and persecuted peoples of faith. It is there that many of American missionaries and their children and wives are buried in the specially designated cemetery, such as Dr. Joseph Plumb Cochran (1855-1905).

Notable people  
 Ana Diamond, human rights activist
 Jacob David, pastor and relief worker
 William Ambrose Shedd, missionary

See also

 Assyrians in Iran
 List of Assyrian settlements

References 

Assyrian settlements
Populated places in Urmia County